The Roman Catholic Diocese of Berbérati is a Latin suffragan diocese in the Ecclesiastical province of the Metropolitan Archbishop of Bangui, both in the Central African Republic. However it remains under the authority of the missionary Roman Congregation for the Evangelization of Peoples.

Its episcopal see is the cathedral in Berbérati, in the Mambéré-Kadéï Prefecture (southwest, formerly Haute-Sangha). The city also has the former cathedral dedicated to Saint Anna.

Statistics 
As per 2014, it pastorally served 214,000 Catholics (48.3% of 443,000 total) on 44,000 km² in 16 parishes and 7 missions, with 30 priests (24 diocesan, 6 religious), 34 lay religious (10 brothers, 24 sisters) and 33 seminarians .

History 
 Established on May 28, 1940 as Apostolic Prefecture of Berbérati, on territories split off from the Apostolic Vicariate of Foumban (also in Cameroon) and the Apostolic Vicariate of Oubangui Chari (now Central African Republic). Lost territory 1947.01.09 to establish the then Apostolic Prefecture of Fort-Lamy (in Chad)
 Promoted on March 13, 1952 as Apostolic Vicariate of Berbérati, hence entitled to a (titular) bishop
 September 14, 1955: Promoted as Diocese of Berbérati
 Lost territories on:
February 9, 1959 to establish the Apostolic Prefecture of Bossangoa and 
February 27, 1978 to establish the Diocese of Bouar.

Ordinaries 
(all Roman rite; so far all members of missionary congregations)

Apostolic Prefect of Berbérati  
 Father Pietro Alcantara da Habas, O.F.M. Cap. (March 28, 1941 – death 1952)

 Apostolic Vicar of Berbérati  
 Alphonse-Célestin-Basile Baud, O.F.M. Cap. (April 10, 1954  – September 14, 1955 see below), Titular Bishop of Risinium (April 10, 1954  – September 14, 1955), French

 Suffragan Bishops of Berbérati 
 Alphonse-Célestin-Basile Baud, O.F.M. Cap. (see above September 14, 1955 – retired June 2, 1979, died 1981), French
 Jérôme-Michel-Francis Martin, O.F.M. Cap. (October 3, 1987 – retired June 17, 1991, died 2009), French
 Agostino Giuseppe Delfino, O.F.M. Cap. (June 17, 1991 – retired June 17, 2010), Italian
 Dennis Kofi Agbenyadzi, S.M.A. (May 14, 2012 - ...), first native Ordinary

See also 
 Roman Catholicism in the Central African Republic

References

External links and sources 
 GCatholic.org

Roman Catholic dioceses in the Central African Republic
Roman Catholic Ecclesiastical Province of Bangui
Christian organizations established in 1940
Roman Catholic dioceses and prelatures established in the 20th century
Mambéré-Kadéï